Chandler Bay is a bay in Jonesport, Maine.

It is separated from Englishman Bay to the northeast by Roque Island and Great Spruce Island.
The bay extends roughly 6 mi. (10 km) and is 2.5 mi. (4 km) at its widest.

Bays of Washington County, Maine
Jonesport, Maine